Washington Summit Publishers (WSP) is a white nationalist publisher based in Augusta, Georgia, which produces and sells books on race and intelligence and related topics. The company is run by white supremacist Richard B. Spencer, who is also director of the National Policy Institute.

History
Before Spencer, the company was run by Louis Andrews. He was also director of the National Policy Institute and managing editor of The Occidental Quarterly, both heavily funded by William Regnery II.

In 2013, the company was listed as being headquartered in Whitefish, Montana. As of 2019, the company had moved to Augusta, Georgia.

Authors
Authors published by WSP include J. Philippe Rushton, Kevin B. MacDonald, Richard Lynn, Tatu Vanhanen, and Michael H. Hart.

Journal
WSP has published Radix Journal through its imprint Radix. The biannual publication has described itself as "a periodical on culture, race, metapolitics, critical theory, and society." Contributors have included Jared Taylor, Kevin B. MacDonald, Alex Kurtagić, and Samuel T. Francis.

Subjects
This company has published content supportive of white nationalism and white supremacy. "Human biodiversity" (HBD), an alt-right euphemism for scientific racism, was one of the main publishing subjects of Washington Summit Publishers. The Southern Poverty Law Center (SPLC) said in 2006 that the company had reprinted racist tracts along with books promoting antisemitism and eugenics. In 2015, the SPLC listed Washington Summit Publishers as a white nationalist hate group.

References

Alt-right organizations
American companies established in 2006
Book publishing companies of the United States
Companies based in Augusta, Georgia
Publishing companies established in 2006
Race and intelligence controversy
Scientific racism
White nationalism in the United States